The 1977 Nobel Prize in Literature was awarded to the Spanish poet Vicente Aleixandre (1898–1984) "for a creative poetic writing, which illuminates man's condition in the cosmos and in present-day society, at the same time representing the great renewal of the traditions of Spanish poetry between the wars." Aleixandre is the first Spanish author living in Spain to win the prize since before General Franco established his four‐decade‐long civil war of the 1930s because the 1956 recipient Juan Ramon Jimenez was a Spanish Civil War exile living in Puerto Rico.

Laureate

Vicente Aleixandre belonged to the Generation of '27, an influential group of surrealist avant-garde poets that includes Guillén, Alberti, García Lorca and Prados. His debut as a poet came with Ámbito ("Ambit"), a poetry collection that appeared in 1928 but with less success. His distinctive style was developed later in the 1930s with the works Espadas como labios ("Swords as Lips", 1932), La destruccion o el amor ("Destruction or Love", 1935) and Sombra del paraiso ("Shadow of Paradise", 1944). With the outbreak of the Spanish Civil War, his poetic compositions underwent a gradual transition from lofty verses to simpler imagery. For a time, his poetic works were totally banned by the fascist regime but the ban was lifted in 1944. He lived a reclusive life throughout his writing career.

Reactions
Little known outside the Spanish speaking world, Vicente Aleixandre was seen as a surprise choice by the Swedish Academy. Doris Lessing (awarded in 2007), Günter Grass (awarded in 1999) and the Turkish author Yasar Kemal had been mentioned as favourites to win the prize.

References

External links
 1977 Press release nobelprize.org

1977